"I Surrender" is a song recorded by Canadian country music artist Michelle Wright. It was released in 2000 as the second single from her first greatest hits album, The Greatest Hits Collection. It peaked at number 10 on the RPM Country Tracks chart in April 2000.  In 2001 it was named by SOCAN as one of the most performed Canadian country songs.

Chart performance

References

2000 singles
Michelle Wright songs
Songs written by Michelle Wright
2000 songs